"Sour Suite" is a song written by Burton Cummings and performed by The Guess Who.  It reached #12 in Canada and #50 on the Billboard Hot 100 in 1972.  The song was featured on their 1971 album, So Long, Bannatyne. Cummings said it took between two and three days to write the song. Its lyric about being "back in 46201" refers to a zip code for Indianapolis. Cummings took it from the return address of a letter sent to him by a female fan.

The song was produced by Jack Richardson.

The single's B-side, "Life in the Bloodstream", also charted reaching #39 in Canada.

References

1971 songs
1971 singles
Songs written by Burton Cummings
The Guess Who songs
Song recordings produced by Jack Richardson (record producer)
RCA Victor singles